Cameron Clark (born November 16, 1997) is a former American football offensive tackle. He played college football at Charlotte. He was drafted by the New York Jets in the fourth round of the 2020 NFL Draft.

College career
After playing at Ben L. Smith High School in Greensboro, North Carolina, Clark committed to Charlotte on June 19, 2014, choosing the 49ers over Appalachian State, James Madison and Old Dominion. Clark redshirted his true freshman year, recorded two starts at left tackle his redshirt freshman year, and started eight games during his sophomore season on the way to being named the 49ers' offensive MVP. Clark was later named a team captain his junior and senior seasons.

By the end of his senior season, Clark had set the Charlotte program record for games played in, setting the mark at 49 contests. He named a member of the first-team all-Conference USA roster after the regular season concluded. After his senior season, Clark participated in the East-West Shrine Game and 2020 NFL Scouting Combine.

Professional career
Clark was selected by the New York Jets with a fourth-round pick (129th overall) in the 2020 NFL Draft. He was placed on injured reserve on September 7, 2020. He was activated on October 24.

On August 17, 2021, Clark was placed on injured reserve stemming from a spinal cord injury, ending his season. 

Clark retired from football on February 2, 2022, citing a risk of paralysis due to the spinal cord injury. He was then waived by the Jets on April 26, 2022 following a failed physical.

Personal life
While he played football at Ben L. Smith High School, Clark attended another Greensboro-area school, The Academy at Smith High School.

References

External links
Charlotte bio

Living people
1997 births
American football offensive tackles
Charlotte 49ers football players
New York Jets players
Players of American football from Greensboro, North Carolina